The 2023 Kogi State gubernatorial election will take place on 11 November 2023 to elect the Governor of Kogi State. Incumbent APC Governor Yahaya Bello is term-limited and cannot seek re-election to a third term. The primaries are scheduled for between 27 March and 17 April 2022.

Electoral system
The Governor of Kogi State is elected using a modified two-round system. To be elected in the first round, a candidate must receive the plurality of the vote and over 25% of the vote in at least two-thirds of state local government areas. If no candidate passes this threshold, a second round will be held between the top candidate and the next candidate to have received a plurality of votes in the highest number of local government areas.

Background
Kogi State is a diverse state in the North Central with a large number of mineral resources but facing an underdeveloped agricultural sector, deforestation, and low vaccination rates.

Politically, the state's early 2019 elections were described by a swing towards the APC as the party was mainly successful, unseating almost all PDP senators and house members to sweep most House of Representatives and two senate seats as the state was won by APC presidential nominee Muhammadu Buhari with over 54%. The House of Assembly election also was a win for the APC as the party won every seat in the assembly. The November election ended similarly with Bello winning election to a second term and the APC gained a senate seat in a rerun election; however, both elections were riddled with irregularities and electoral violence.

In Bello's second inaugural address in 2020, he declared that his second term would highlight agricultural development, increasing employment, and improving the state's revenue. Performance-wise, Bello was commended for gender inclusion in his cabinet but his term was immensely controversial as he was criticized for inciting electoral violence, autocratic actions, lies about COVID-19 and vaccines, and further corruption allegations.

Primary elections
The primaries, along with any potential challenges to primary results, will take place between 27 March and 17 April 2022. While no formal zoning agreement is in place, groups from Kogi West Senatorial District (specifically some groups representing the Okun people) have called for the governorship to be zoned to their district with the justification of no elected governor having come from Kogi West beforehand. On the other hand, groups from Kogi Central Senatorial District (specifically some groups representing the Ebira people) are pushing for the office to be retained by their district by claiming that Kogi East Senatorial District held the office for over four terms and thus Kogi Central should as well.

All Progressives Congress 
Ahead of the APC primary, major questions were asked about which candidate would receive the endorsement of Bello to be his successor. However, after the May 2022 primary for federal positions resulted in several losses for Bello loyalists, new questions emerged over Bello's waning control of the state party.

Purchased forms 
 Smart Adeyemi: Senator for Kogi West (2007–2015; 2019–present)
 Abdulkareem Mohammad Jamiu: Chief of Staff to Governor Bello (2019–present)
 Abiodun Faleke: former House of Representatives member for Ikeja (Lagos State) (2011–present) and 2015 APC deputy gubernatorial nominee
 Jibril Momoh: state Accountant General
 Ahmed Usman Ododo: state Auditor-General for Local Government
 Sanusi Ohiare: former Executive Director of the Rural Electrification Agency
 Salami Ozigi-Deedat: Commissioner for Local Government and Chieftaincy Affairs

Declared 
 Dayo Akanmode

Potential 
 Toba Adebayo: former Bello administration official
 Jibrin Isah: Senator for Kogi East (2019–present) and 2011 and 2015 PDP gubernatorial candidate
 Mukadam Ashiru Idris: Commissioner of Finance
 Babatunde Irukera: 2015 and 2019 APC gubernatorial candidate and CEO of the FCCPC
 Khalifa Abdulrahman Okene: 2019 APC Kogi Central senatorial candidate
 Edward David Onoja: Deputy Governor (2019–present)

People's Democratic Party

Purchased forms 
 Yomi Awoniyi: former Deputy Governor and son of former Senator Sunday Awoniyi

Potential 
 Natasha Akpoti: 2019 SDP gubernatorial nominee and 2019 SDP Kogi Central senatorial nominee
 Abubakar Idris: son of former Governor Ibrahim Idris
 Dino Melaye: 2019 PDP gubernatorial candidate and former Senator for Kogi West (2015–2019)
 Musa Wada: 2019 APC gubernatorial nominee and brother of former Governor Idris Wada

Conduct

Electoral timetable

General election

Results

By senatorial district 
The results of the election by senatorial district.

By federal constituency 
The results of the election by federal constituency.

By local government area 
The results of the election by local government area.

Notes

See also 
 2023 Nigerian elections
 2023 Nigerian gubernatorial elections

References 

Kogi State gubernatorial election
2023
2023 Kogi State elections
Kogi